The 2017–18 B.League season was the second season of the Japanese B.League.

B1 Regular season

B1 Playoffs

B1 Final

B1 Relegation playoffs

B1 Individual statistic leaders

B2 Regular season

B2 Playoffs

B2 Individual statistic leaders

B3 season

B3 First stage

B3 Regular season

B3 Final stage

B3 Individual statistic leaders

References 

2017–18 in Asian basketball leagues
B.League
B.League seasons